Irish coffee is a cocktail.

Irish Coffee may also refer to:

Irish Coffee (band), a Belgian hard rock band
Irish Coffee (TV series), a Canadian talk show